Deulgaon is a common name of town in state of Maharashtra. In Marathi language, Gaon literally means town.Deulgaon may refer to:

Deulgaon Awachar, Manwat taluka, Parbhani district.
Deulgaon Bazar, Sillod taluka, Aurangabad district (Maharashtra).
Deulgaon Dhudhate, Purna taluka, Parbhani district.
Deulgaon Ghat, Ashti taluka, Beed district.
Deulgaon Kaman, Bhokardan taluka, Jalna district.
Deulgaon Kol, Sindkhed Raja taluka, Buldhana district.
Deulgaon Kundpal, Lonar taluka, Buldhana district.
Deulgaon Mahi, Deulgaon Raja taluka, Buldhana district.
Deulgaon Raja, Buldhana district.
Deulgaon Tad, Bhokardan taluka, Jalna district.